The Tanzania women's national field hockey team represent Tanzania in women's international competitions and is controlled by the Tanzania Hockey Association, the governing body for field hockey in Uganda.

They have participated once in the Africa Cup of Nations in 2013 when they finished fourth.

Tournament record

Africa Cup of Nations
2013 – 4th

African Olympic Qualifier
2015 – 7th

Hockey World League
2014–15 – Round 1

See also
Tanzania men's national field hockey team

References

African women's national field hockey teams
National team
Field hockey